Philip Adeyemo (born 19 May 1949) is an Anglican bishop in Nigeria: he is Bishop of the Omu-Aran diocese, one of seven in the  Anglican Province of Kwara, itself one of 14 within the Church of Nigeria.

Adeyemo was born on 19 May 1949 in Oyun, Kwara State. He was educated at the University of Ilorin and Imanuel College of Theology, Ibadan. He worked with gateway Insurance Co before training as a priest. He held incumbencies in Osere before becoming an Archdeacon.

He retired in 2019, having reached the mandatory retirement age of 70.

Notes

Anglican bishops of Omu-Aran
People from Kwara State
Alumni of Immanuel College of Theology, Ibadan
21st-century Anglican bishops in Nigeria
21st-century Anglican archbishops
1959 births
Living people
University of Ilorin alumni
Church of Nigeria archdeacons